The 2019–20 Kansas Jayhawks women's basketball team represented the University of Kansas in the 2019–20 NCAA Division I women's basketball season. The Jayhawks were led by fifth year head coach Brandon Schneider. They played their home games at Allen Fieldhouse in Lawrence, Kansas as members of the Big 12 Conference.

They finished the season 15–14, 4–14 in Big 12 play to finish in last place. The Big 12 Tournament, NCAA women's basketball tournament and WNIT were all cancelled before they began due to the COVID-19 pandemic.

Previous season

The Jayhawks finished the season 13–18, 2–16 in Big 12 play to finish in last place. They advanced in the quarterfinals of the Big 12 Tournament where they lost to Iowa State.

Roster

Schedule and results 

Source:

|-
!colspan=12 style=| Exhibition

|-
!colspan=12 style=| Non-conference regular season

|-
!colspan=12 style=| Big 12 regular season

|-
!colspan=12 style=| Big 12 Tournament

Rankings
2019–20 NCAA Division I women's basketball rankings

See also 
 2019–20 Kansas Jayhawks men's basketball team

References 

Kansas Jayhawks women's basketball seasons
Kansas
Kansas Jayhawks women's basketball
Kansas Jayhawks women's basketball